The Great River Railroad  is a  shortline railroad that runs from Rosedale to a connection with the Columbus and Greenville Railway in Greenville, Mississippi.

Formerly part of Illinois Central Gulf, the railroad segment was purchased by the Port of Rosedale in 1981. The line has been embargoed since 2001.

Bolivar County and Chicago, Rock Island and Pacific Railroad (Rock Island Rail) are planning to reopen the rail line. In August 2020, the county owned port authority and Rock Island Rail agreed to start clearing and repairing the infrastructure.

Motive Power
GTR has two switcher locomotives, both of them ex-US Army and stored at the Port of Rosedale
ALCO S-1 GTR 8341
ALCO S-2 GTR 2

References

Bolivar County, Mississippi
Defunct Mississippi railroads
Railway companies disestablished in 2001
Railway companies established in 1981